There are three schools in the Tulelake Basin Joint Unified School District, all of which are in the town of Tulelake, in Siskiyou County, California, United States. The school district is served by Modoc County Office of Education. Kindergarten through sixth grades are taught at Tulelake Elementary, where the mascot is the Gosling, a reflection of area waterfowl.  Tulelake High School, located in the town of Tulelake, instructs grades seven through twelve, and its mascot is the Honker, a slang term for the Canada goose. Tulelake Continuation School serves students that are in need of making up credits.

Schools
Tulelake Elementary School (K-6)
Tulelake High School (7-12)
Tulelake Continuation School

References

External links
 

School districts in Modoc County, California
School districts in Siskiyou County, California